"Up in a Puff of Smoke" is a song recorded in 1974 by Polly Brown, released as a non-album single to become an international Top 40 hit in 1975.

Overview
The songwriting/production team of Gerry Shury and Ron Roker had admired Brown's voice from her Pickettywitch recordings. Shury, who had arranged Brown's 1972 self-titled album release, described her as a cross "between Diana Ross and Dionne Warwick".  In 1974, Shury and Roker had Brown record the neo-Motown number "Up in a Puff of Smoke". In the same session Brown, with Roker as co-vocalist, recorded a cover of the ABBA song "Honey, Honey", which was released under the name Sweet Dreams. 

Canadian blue-eyed soul singer Charity Brown turned down the chance to cover "Up in a Puff of Smoke" for the Canadian market, but she did record the B-side song of the Polly Brown single, the mid-tempo  Shury/Swern ballad "I'm Saving All My Love", as "Saving All My Love". Introduced on Brown's 1975 album release Rock Me, the track was released as a single, reaching #61 on the Canadian singles chart in February 1976.

Chart history
"Up in a Puff of Smoke" proved to be a UK Top 40 shortfall although it did spend five weeks in the Top 50, peaking at #43. However, the track became a major hit in several English speaking countries: Australia (#22), Canada (#11), New Zealand (#13), and the US (#16).

Weekly charts

Year-end charts

Cover versions
In 2018, Linda Martin remade "Up in a Puff of Smoke", with Nicki French on background vocals. Issued in January 2018, the track was included on Martin's All Woman album released September 2018.

References

External links
 

1974 songs
1975 singles
GTO Records singles
Songs written by Gerry Shury